José Luis Reséndez Santos (born October 14, 1978 in Monterrey, Nuevo León, Mexico) is a Mexican actor and model. He won the national male pageant El Modelo México and represented his country in Mister World 2003, held in London, England, where he finished  as the 3rd runner-up. As an actor, he has participated in more than 13 soap operas with international TV companies such as Televisa and Telemundo.

In 2003, he was selected by producer Pedro Torres, a guru in the entertainment industry in Latin America, to participate to the reality show Big brother, where he got known by millions. Reséndez took part to the most important TV shows of Mexico and Latin America as a guest. As of today, his name has considerably grown into acting industry.

José, called by his friends by the nickname “Joe Reséndez” or simply “Reséndez”, started acting at age 10, having the best drama teachers of Monterrey. He acted in one of the best theaters of the city, the “Teatro Nova”.

In 2013, he is the protagonist of the soap opera Dama y Obrero, which aired on Telemundo on June 24.

Filmography

Film

Television roles

External links

José Luis Reséndez

Living people
1978 births
Male actors from Monterrey
Male beauty pageant winners
Mexican male models
Mexican male telenovela actors
Mexican beauty pageant winners